Samuel Baud-Bovy (1906–1986) was a Swiss musician.

1906 births
1986 deaths
20th-century Swiss musicians